Vijaya (meaning Victorious; Chinese: 尸唎皮奈, pinyin: Shīlì Pínài; Vietnamese: Thị Lợi Bi Nai; Chinese alt: 新州, pinyin: Xīnzhōu, lit. 'New Province'; Vietnamese alts: Đồ Bàn or Chà Bàn), also known as Vijayapura, is an ancient city in Bình Định province, Vietnam. From the 12th century, it served as the capital of the Kingdom of Champa until it was conquered by Dai Viet during the Champa–Dai Viet War of 1471.

Geography, economy, transport
Vijaya was centred on the lowland area along lower Côn River, in what is now the south of Bình Định Province. To the east of the plain and near the estuary of the river is a strategic and well-protected location for a port. This led to the rise of Cảng Thị Nại, one of the major ports of Champa. The river leading up into the highlands to the west was important for the trade with highland peoples supplying Champa with luxury goods such as eaglewood for export. Vijaya's geography was also important for its agriculture. With one of the larger rivers of Champa, its soils were more fertile than that of many other places. This allowed for a relatively large concentration of people near the centre of Vijaya, which resulted in a relatively large number of temples.

According to two noteworthy 15th century reports noted in Vietnamese grand chronicles, the Toàn thư, Vijaya had a small number of households, just 2,500, or approximately 10,000 inhabitants. More accurate, the second report states that the city had about 70,000 people living inside.

History
The area around Vijaya was probably one of earliest landfalls of the Cham people in what is now Vietnam. However, its architecture implies that it did not become important until the 11th or 12th century. Records suggest that there was an attack on Vijaya's citadel from the Vietnamese in 1069 (when Dai Viet was ruled by Lý Nhân Tông) to punish Champa for armed raiding in Vietnam. The Cham king Rudravarman III was defeated and captured and offered Champa's three northern provinces to Dai Viet (present-day Quảng Bình and Quảng Trị provinces). 

In Champa at the time there were two ruling kings–Parameśvaravarman and Rudravarman III–in Nha Trang and Phan Rang, respectively.  Rudravarman of Phan Rang had good relation with the Chinese Song dynasty. None of them ever did manage to travel far north to counter the Vietnamese. Northern Champa at that time was ruled by a Cham chief/warlord with title Śrī Yuvarāja Mahāsenāpati, not related to the Parameśvaravarman–Bhadravarman–Rudravarman family.

The Vietnamese raid in 1069 began embarking from a port in Hue on 28th day of the third month, reached their destination of the third day of fourth month, then engaged with the Cham. Sailing from Hue to Vijaya (Qui Nhon) within six days doesn't make sense. King Ðệ Củ/Chế Củ had been fleeing into Cambodia (Zhenla), was then captured. They pillaged the city of Indrapura (Phật thệ) for one month, then it took one month for them to return to Hanoi. Michael Vickery insists that the 1069 Vietnamese raid did not target Vijaya, but probably Châu Sa & Cổ Lũy citadels on the north and south banks of the Trà Khúc River in Quảng Ngãi province. Châu Sa was a large port city named Amaravati, has the temple of Chánh Lộ dating to eleventh century. He also speculates that Chế Củ was certainly not king Rudravarman III, but a Cham chief somewhere in the north. The earliest mention of Vijaya as a Cham city was dated to around 1153 to 1184, so the explicitly application of Vijaya for a location of Champa prior that period should be considered an historical anachronism.

Vijaya was involved in wars with Angkor (now Cambodia) in the 12th and 13th centuries. Khmer military incursions into Champa were successful for some time and Suryavarman II managed to subdue Vijaya in the 1145, deposing Jaya Indravarman III, but the Khmer were later defeated in 1149. Vijaya was at times dominated by the Khmer king Jayavarman VII. The Khmer king relied on Cham supporters for his successful military campaigns in both Angkor and Champa.

Vijaya was captured by the Yuan army led by Mongol commander Sogetu in early 1283. The Mongols were ultimately driven away, but the city was sacked. In 1377, the city was unsuccessfully besieged by a Vietnamese army in the Battle of Vijaya. Major wars with Vietnam were fought again in the 15th century, which eventually led to the defeat of Vijaya and the demise of Champa in 1471. The citadel of Vijaya was besieged for one month in 1403 when the Vietnamese troops had to withdraw because of a shortage of food. The final attack came in early 1471 after almost 70 years without major military confrontation between Champa and Dai Viet. It is interpreted to have been a reaction to Champa asking China for reinforcements to attack Dai Viet. Much of Champa was dissolved after the 1471 Cham–Vietnamese War; Vijaya was complete destroyed; while other southern principalities had a protectorate-like status within Dai Viet.

Architecture
Vijaya's architecture distinguishes it from other Champa centers, because it used a combination of stone and brick elements, while most other Cham structures only used bricks. This suggests some influence from Cambodian Angkor. It also points to the relative abundance of labour in Vijaya compared to other Champa centres of powers, because processing stones for construction was more labour-intensive than the production of bricks. Vijaya's style of architecture seems to have been dominant throughout Champa for some time, given the later classification of the architecture from the period between the 12th and 14th centuries as the 'Binh Dinh style'.

Remains

 
A relatively large number of towers built in Vijaya have been preserved in Bình Định Province. They include the ruins of the citadel: Cánh Tiên tower and several temple towers. The Dương Long towers are among Southeast Asia's tallest Hinduist buildings.

Capital of Tây Sơn dynasty
The ruins of Tây Sơn era Hoang De citadel lies within the old Champa city walls.

References

Bibliography
Hardy, Andrew (2009): "Eaglewood and the Economic History of Champa and Central Vietnam". in Hardy, Andrew et al. (ed): Champa and the Archaeology of Mỹ Sơn (Vietnam). NUS Press, Singapore
Nguyễn Đình Đầu (2009): "The Vietnamese Southward Expansion, as Viewed Through the Histories". in Hardy, Andrew et al. (ed): Champa and the Archaeology of Mỹ Sơn (Vietnam). NUS Press, Singapore
Trần Kỳ Phương (2009): "The Architecture of the Temple-Towers of Ancient Champa". in Hardy, Andrew et al. (ed): Champa and the Archaeology of Mỹ Sơn (Vietnam). NUS Press, Singapore
Vickery, Michael (2009): "A Short History of Champa". in Hardy, Andrew et al. (ed): Champa and the Archaeology of Mỹ Sơn (Vietnam). NUS Press, Singapore

Champa
Buildings and structures in Bình Định province
Destroyed cities 

vi:Đồ Bàn